Gleb Anatolyevich Panfilov (born 21 May 1934 in Magnitogorsk) is an internationally acclaimed Russian film director noted for a string of mostly historical films starring his wife, Inna Churikova.

Biography 
In the 1980s Panfilov, a chemist by profession, moved to theatre directing, but also found time to adapt for the screen Alexander Vampilov's play Valentina (1981), as well as Maxim Gorky's Vassa Zheleznova (1983) and Mother (1989). Vassa won the Golden Prize at the 13th Moscow International Film Festival and Russia's State Prize. He won the Golden Bear at the 37th Berlin International Film Festival for the film The Theme.

Despite the hardships of the 1990s Panfilov was committed to directing The Romanovs: An Imperial Family, an epic story of the Romanov sainthood. The film, finally released in 2000, was a sort of family project involving his wife as well as children. It was also his first movie that did not feature his wife in a leading role.

In 2000 at the 22nd Moscow International Film Festival Panfilov was awarded an Honorable Prize for his contribution to cinema.

In January 2006 RTR TV aired Panfilov's miniseries based on Alexander Solzhenitsyn's novel The First Circle. The Nobel Prize-winning author helped adapt the novel for the screen and narrated the film.

Filmography

Director
Narodnaya militsya (1958)
Vstavay v nash stroy! (1959)
Nina Melovizinova (1962) (TV)
Ubit ne na voyne (1962) (TV)
Delo Kurta Klauzevitsa (1963) (TV)
V ogne broda net (1967)
Nachalo (1970)
I Want the Floor (1975)
Tema (1979)
Valentina (1981)
Vassa (1983)
Mother (1990)
Romanovy: Ventsenosnaya semya (2000)
V kruge pervom (2006) (TV mini-series)
Ivan Denisovich (2021)

Writer
Ubit ne na voyne (1962) (TV)
Delo Kurta Klauzevitsa (1963) (TV)
V ogne broda net (1967)
Nachalo (1970)
Proshu slova (1975)
Chelovek, kotoromu vezlo (1978)
Tema (1979)
Vstrecha (1979)
Valentina (1981)
Vassa (1983)
Mother (1990)
Romanovy: Ventsenosnaya semya (2000)

References

 Who Is Who in Modern Russian Culture
 Gleb Panfilov in Krugosvet Encyclopaedia

External links
 
 Official Site

1934 births
Living people
High Courses for Scriptwriters and Film Directors alumni
Academic staff of High Courses for Scriptwriters and Film Directors
Russian film directors
Soviet film directors
Academicians of the National Academy of Motion Picture Arts and Sciences of Russia
Directors of Golden Bear winners